Dallas High School is a former public secondary school in Dallas, Texas. It is the alma mater of several notable Americans, including former US Attorney General and Supreme Court Justice Tom C. Clark. Built in 1907, the 3.5-story classical revival structure is located in the downtown City Center District next to the Pearl/Arts District DART light rail station.

National Register historic district
The school campus was added to the National Register of Historic Places as the Dallas High School Historic District in 1996. The historic district comprises five contributing properties:
Auditorium and Classroom Building, 1907
Girls' Gymnasium and Manual Training Building, 1919-1920
Classroom Building, 1930
Arts and Science Building, 1941
Boys' Gymnasium and Dressing Room, 1954

History
Dallas High School changed names several times, becoming Main High School in 1916, Bryan Street High School in 1917, Dal-Tech High School in 1928, Crozier Technical High School in 1942, and Business Magnet School in 1976. The school closed in 1995.

After being vacant for over 20 years, the building was renovated to become a mixed-use development with the first tenant arriving in 2017.

Notable alumni
 Tom C. Clark
 C. Wright Mills
 Mike McKool, Sr.

See also
National Register of Historic Places listings in Dallas County, Texas
List of Dallas Landmarks

References

External links
 

1907 establishments in Texas
1995 disestablishments in Texas
Educational institutions disestablished in 1995
Educational institutions established in 1907
Former high schools in Texas
Former school buildings in the United States
Neoclassical architecture in Texas
Public high schools in Dallas
School buildings completed in 1907
Historic districts on the National Register of Historic Places in Texas